The 2016 Hobart International was a women's tennis tournament played on outdoor hard courts. It was the 23nd edition of the event and part of the WTA International tournaments of the 2016 WTA Tour. It took place at the Hobart International Tennis Centre in Hobart, Australia from 10 through 16 January 2016.

Points and prize money

Point distribution

Prize money

1 Points per the WTA.
2 Qualifiers prize money is also the Round of 32 prize money
* per team

Singles main-draw entrants

Seeds

1 Rankings as of 4 January 2016.

Other entrants
The following players received wildcards into the singles main draw:
  Kimberly Birrell
  Maddison Inglis
  Jarmila Wolfe

The following players received entry from the qualifying draw:
  Kiki Bertens 
  Kurumi Nara 
  Naomi Osaka
  Laura Pous Tió

The following players received entry as lucky losers:
  Verónica Cepede Royg
  Pauline Parmentier

Withdrawals
Before the tournament
  Petra Cetkovská → replaced by  Carina Witthöft
  Alison Riske (change of schedule) → replaced by  Pauline Parmentier
  Sloane Stephens (viral illness) → replaced by  Verónica Cepede Royg

During the tournament
  Mona Barthel (back injury)

Retirements
  Madison Brengle (respiratory illness)

Doubles main-draw entrants

Seeds

1 Rankings as of 4 January 2016.

Other entrants 
The following pair received a wildcard into the doubles main draw:
  Maddison Inglis /  Jessica Moore

Withdrawals 
During the tournament
  Johanna Larsson (thigh injury)

Champions

Singles

  Alizé Cornet def.  Eugenie Bouchard, 6–1, 6–2

Doubles

  Han Xinyun /  Christina McHale def.  Kimberly Birrell /  Jarmila Wolfe, 6–3, 6–0

References

External links
Official website

 
Hobart International
Hobart International
Hobart International